The Japanese School in Zurich (Chūrihhi Nihonjin Gakkō) is a Japanese international school in Uster, Canton of Zürich, Switzerland, situated in the Zurich metropolitan area. It has a day school division and it has a weekend complementary school that meets on Wednesdays and Saturdays. It is the sole non-boarding Japanese day school in Switzerland, and it serves kindergarten, elementary school, and junior high school (equivalent to Zurich cantonal Sekundarstufe I).

Japanese School in Zurich's primary education program (elementary) is approved as Primarstufe by the bureau for elementary school (Volksschulamt), administration for education (Bildungsdirektion), canton of Zurich. However, not the Kindergarten.

The Japanese School in Zurich's lower secondary education program (junior-secondary) is approved as Sekundarstufe by the bureau for elementary school (Volksschulamt), administration for education (Bildungsdirektion), canton of Zurich.

On 20 October 1975, the Japanese Language School in Zurich, the predecessor institution, opened with 15 students. On 23 April 1988, the permanent day school Japanese School in Zurich opened with 57 students, of which 50 were elementary school students and 7 were junior high school students.

Students take Japanese and English courses, and they also take German two times every week.

See also
 Kumon Leysin Academy of Switzerland, private Japanese high school in Switzerland

Further reading
  "Japanische Schule." Schweiz Aktuell. Schweizer Radio und Fernsehen. 15 April 2002.

References

External links

 
 Japanese School in Zurich 
 Japanese School in Zurich (Archive) – Mid-2000s
 Japanese School in Zurich (Archive) – 1999–2000

Zurich
Zurich
Buildings and structures in the canton of Zürich
Education in Zürich
1988 establishments in Switzerland
Educational institutions established in 1988
Zurich